Alicante is one of the three constituencies represented in the Corts Valencianes, the regional legislature of the Valencian Community. The constituency currently elects 35 deputies. Its boundaries correspond to those of the Spanish province of Alicante. The electoral system uses the D'Hondt method and a closed-list proportional representation, with a minimum threshold of five percent regionally.

Electoral system
The constituency was created as per the Statute of Autonomy of the Valencian Community of 1982 and was first contested in the 1983 regional election. The Statute provided for the three provinces in the Valencian Community—Alicante, Castellón and Valencia—to be established as multi-member districts in the Corts Valencianes, with this regulation being maintained under the 1987 regional electoral law. Each constituency is entitled to an initial minimum of 20 seats, with the remaining 39—29 until 2007—being distributed in proportion to their populations (provided that the seat-to-population ratio in any given province did not exceed three times that of any other). The exception was the 1983 election, when each constituency was allocated a fixed number of seats: 29 for Alicante, 25 for Castellón and 35 for Valencia.

Voting is on the basis of universal suffrage, which comprises all nationals over eighteen, registered in the Valencian Community and in full enjoyment of their political rights. Amendments to the electoral law in 2011 required for Valencians abroad to apply for voting before being permitted to vote, a system known as "begged" or expat vote. Seats are elected using the D'Hondt method and a closed list proportional representation, with a threshold of five percent of valid votes—which includes blank ballots—being applied regionally. Parties not reaching the threshold are not taken into consideration for seat distribution.

The electoral law allows for parties and federations registered in the interior ministry, coalitions and groupings of electors to present lists of candidates. Parties and federations intending to form a coalition ahead of an election are required to inform the relevant Electoral Commission within ten days of the election call—fifteen before 1985—whereas groupings of electors need to secure the signature of at least one percent of the electorate in the constituencies for which they seek election—one-thousandth of the electorate, with a compulsory minimum of 500 signatures, until 1985—disallowing electors from signing for more than one list of candidates.

Deputies

Elections

2019 regional election

2015 regional election

2011 regional election

2007 regional election

2003 regional election

1999 regional election

1995 regional election

1991 regional election

1987 regional election

1983 regional election

References

Corts Valencianes constituencies
Province of Alicante
Constituencies established in 1983
1983 establishments in Spain